Fatimé Dordji, also Fatimé N'Dordji (14 July 1949 - 30 November 2016) was a businesswoman and journalist from Chad. She was the first woman from the country to be employed as a radio announcer.

Biography 
Dordji was born on 14 July 1949 in Ati, Chad. She was brought up in the town of Sarh by her mother, who was an Arab, and her step-father, who worked as a soldier. At the age of fourteen she moved to N’Djamena, where she was employed as a radio announcer, due to her knowledge of both French and Arabic. She was the first woman to be employed in such a role. By 1965 she was a well-known radio personality on Radiodiffusion Tchadienne. The same year she married a policeman, and future politician, named Senoussi Khater, with whom she went on to have seven children.

In 1973 Dordji became considered as an enemy of the state, as she had named one of her daughters after the politician Kalthouma Nguembang, who President François Tombalbaye had accused of trying to use witchcraft against him. She was imprisoned and then subsequently detained by police for over twenty-one months, although she was never formally charged with criminal activities.

In 1975 Félix Malloum overthrew Tombalbaye, and Dordji's husband was appointed Ambassador to Libya in the new government. from 1978 to 1981 the family lived in Belgium. However during this period she and her husband divorced: he returned to Chad as Minister of Education in the new government, she moved to Libya.

In the 1990s, under the new government of Idriss Déby, Dordji returned to Chad - working first as a radio presenter, then subsequently as a businesswoman. She died on 30 November 2016.

References

Further reading 

 Tubiana, Marie-José. Parcours de femmes: les nouvelles élites: entretiens, 1997-2003: Hadjé Halimé Oumar...[et al.]. Sépia, 2004.

1949 births
2016 deaths
Women radio journalists
Women radio presenters
Chadian women
Chadian journalists
20th-century journalists
People from Batha Region